Sydney John Snell (born 1934) is a former Australian international lawn bowler.

Bowls career
He won double silver at the 1980 World Outdoor Bowls Championship in Frankston; in the team event (Leonard Trophy) and the singles competition. 

He also won a silver medal in the singles at the 1978 Commonwealth Games in Edmonton.

References

1934 births
Living people
Australian male bowls players
Commonwealth Games medallists in lawn bowls
Commonwealth Games silver medallists for Australia
Bowls players at the 1978 Commonwealth Games
Medallists at the 1978 Commonwealth Games